Săcădat is a commune in Bihor County, Crișana, Romania. In 2011, it had a population of 1,910 people. It is composed of three villages: Borșa (Borostelek), Săbolciu (Mezőszabolcs) and Săcădat.

References

Communes in Bihor County
Localities in Crișana